Horti Point is a headland on Merritt Island in Brevard County, Florida.

Merritt Island, Florida
Landforms of Brevard County, Florida
Headlands of Florida
Indian River Lagoon